Benjamin Faneuil Dunkin was a chief justice on the South Carolina Supreme Court. He was born in Philadelphia, Pennsylvania on December 2, 1792; graduated from Harvard University when he was eighteen; and moved to Charleston, South Carolina in 1811. He was elected to the South Carolina House of Representatives and served as its Speaker in 1828 and 1829. Between 1865 and 1868, he was chief justice of the South Carolina Supreme Court. He died on December 5, 1874, at his home in Charleston, South Carolina. He is buried at Magnolia Cemetery, Charleston, South Carolina.

References

1792 births
1874 deaths
Lawyers from Philadelphia
Harvard University alumni
Justices of the South Carolina Supreme Court
Chief Justices of the South Carolina Supreme Court
Burials in South Carolina
19th-century American judges
19th-century American lawyers